HJO may refer to:
 Hjo, a city in Västra Götaland, Sweden
 Hjo Municipality, in Västra Götaland, Sweden
 Hanford Municipal Airport, in California, United States
 Haley Joel Osment, American actor